The 35th Lo Nuestro Awards were held at the Dade Arena in Miami on February 23, 2023, to recognize the most popular Spanish-language music of 2022. The ceremony will be broadcast on Univisión and will be hosted by television presenters Alejandra Espinoza and Adrián Uribe and singers Sebastián Yatra and Paulina Rubio.

The nominees were announced on January 23, 2023, with Colombian singer Sebastián Yatra leading with ten nominations, followed by Bad Bunny, Becky G, Camilo and Grupo Firme, all with nine. Seven new categories were added increasing the number of categories to thirty-nine, these categories are: Regional Mexican New Artist of the Year, Tour of the Year, Male Pop Artist of the Year, Female Pop Artist of the Year, Tropical Album of the Year, Male Regional Mexican Artist of the Year and Female Regional Mexican Artist of the Year. Voting for the winners will be available on the awards page until February 5. The ceremonies’ special merit awards include the Lifetime Achievement award for Puerto Rican singer Victor Manuelle, and Musical Legacy award for Puerto Rican singer Ivy Queen. Queen becomes the first female artist to be recognized with this award.

Performers 
Below is the list of the live performances of the artists and the songs they performed:

Winners and nominees 
The nominations were announced on January 23, 2023.

General

Pop

Urban

Tropical

Regional Mexican

Special Merit Awards
 Lifetime Achievement Award – Victor Manuelle
 Musical Legacy Award – Ivy Queen
 Excellence Award - Intocable

References

External links
 Official website

2023 music awards
2023 awards in the United States
Lo Nuestro Awards by year
2023 in Latin music